Chebika, Kairouan is a town in the Kairouan Governorate, Tunisia.

See also
List of cities in Tunisia
Manbat - Chebika

References

Populated places in Kairouan Governorate